Ginger is the plant Zingiber officinale, parts of which are used as a delicacy, medicine, confessionary or cooking spice.
Ginger may also refer to:

Businesses
 Ginger Hotels, a chain of budget hotels across India
 Ginger Productions, a television production company
 Ginger Software, an Israeli company, providing software for grammar and spelling correction

Films
 Ginger (1935 film), an American comedy film
 Ginger (1946 film), an American drama film by Oliver Drake
 Ginger (2013 film), an Indian film

In print
 Ginger: The Life and Death of Albert Goodwin, a 1990 book by Susan Mayse
 Ginger (book), a children's picture book by Charlotte Voake

Music
 Ginger (band), a 1990s Canadian rock band or their 1993 debut album
 Ginger Wildheart, English rock guitarist, singer, and songwriter David Walls (born 1964)
 Ginger (Brockhampton album) (2019)
 Ginger (Speedy J album) (1993)
 Ginger, an album by The Figgs
 "Ginger", a 1997 song by David Devant & His Spirit Wife
 "Ginger", a song by Irving Berlin
"Ginger", a song by Wizkid featuring Burna Boy from the album Made in Lagos (2020)
"Ginger", a song by Feu! Chatterton from the album "L'oiseleur" (2018)

Places
 Ginger, Washington, United States, an unincorporated community
 Ginger Island, part of the British Virgin Islands
 Ginger Islands, Antarctica

Plants
 Kahili ginger (Hedychium gardnerianum), a native of the Indian sub-content also an invasive weed species in New Zealand
 White ginger (Hedychium flavescens), native to the Himalayas and also an invasive alien in New Zealand

Other uses
 Ginger (name), a list of people and fictional characters with the given name, nickname, or surname
 Hurricane Ginger, a 1971 Atlantic hurricane
 Ginger, the code name used for the Segway PT before its release
 Ginger, a nickname given to the first of the Egyptian Gebelein predynastic mummies
 Ginger, a slang term referring to a person with red hair, sometimes in a derogatory sense

See also
 Ginger Collection, a collection of philatelic material
 Ginger Fish or Kenneth Robert Wilson (born 1965), American drummer
 Ginger Group, a faction of radical Canadian Progressive and Labour Members of Parliament who advocated socialism
 Ginger Group (Queensland), a group of Liberal Party of Australia MLAs during the 1960s, 1970s and 1980s
 Ginger Spice or Geri Halliwell (born 1972), member of the Spice Girls
 London Overground, also known as the "Ginger line" for its color on the Tube map